Christ at the Column is a life-size sculpture by the Spanish artist Gregorio Fernández.

Gregorio Fernández was commissioned by the Illustrious Penitential Brotherhood of the Holy Cross, to undertake a “paso”, a group of wooden statues, depicting the flagellation of Christ. The sculpture of the Christ started as a figure for this composition and was in the mid 17th century when the sculpture was presented as a separate and independent work.
The sculpture is characterized by combining classical form and naturalism with the intensity of religious emotion.

Similar works
Fernández and his workshop executed a number of versions of this subject.

Ávila. St. Teresa's convent (ca. 1632) 
Valladolid, St. Teresa's convent
Madrid,  Royal Convent of the Incarnation (ca.1625)
Madrid. Foundation Banco Santander (ca.1616)
Calahorra. St Joseph's Convent

External links
Christ at the Column, The Flagellation of Christ - Foundation Banco Santander

1610s sculptures
Sculptures by Gregorio Fernández
Sculptures depicting the Passion of Jesus